Dorcadion mniszechi is a species of beetle in the family Cerambycidae. It was described by Kraatz in 1873. It is known from Armenia and Turkey.

References

mniszechi
Beetles described in 1873